This is a list of artists who were born in the Afghanistan or whose artworks are closely associated with that country. Artists are listed by field of study and then by last name in alphabetical order, and they may be listed more than once, if they work in many fields of study.

Architects 
 Zakia Wardak, architect, politician, and businesswoman

Painters 
 Khadim Ali (born 1978), Pakistani-born Australian painter, of Afghani-Hazaras descent
 Abdul Ghafoor Breshna (1907–1974), painter, music composer, poet, and film director
 Shamsia Hassani (born 1988), graffiti artist and professor
 Jalaluddin Jalal (1923–1977), writer, poet and painter
 Karim Shah Khan (1919– c. late-1980s), Realism painter
 Khair Mohammad Khan Yari (1901–1976), painter
 Akbar Khurasani (born 1961), Afghan-born Ukrainian painter
 Mohammad Maimangi (1873–1935), Realism painter
 Hafiz Pakzad (born 1955), Realism painter
 Nasrollah Sarvari (1942–2017), Realism painter

Miniature painters 
 Kamāl ud-Dīn Behzād (c. 1455/60–1535), painter of miniatures, head of the royal ateliers in Herat and Tabriz during the late Timurid and early Safavid Persian periods
 Samira Kitman (born 1984), calligrapher and miniaturist, resides in England
 Dust Muhammad (late 15th century), painter of miniatures, calligrapher, and art historian

Photographers 
 Rada Akbar (born 1988), Afghan-born conceptual artist, and photographer, living in exile
 Massoud Hossaini (born 1981), photojournalist
 Farzana Wahidy (born 1984), documentary photographer and photojournalist

Printmakers 
 Aatifi (born 1965), Afghan-born German contemporary painter, printmaker and calligrapher

Sculptors 
 Malina Suliman (born 1990), metalworker, graffiti artist, and painter,

See also 
 List of Afghans
 List of Afghan women artists

Artists 
Artists
Lists of artists by nationality